Joseph Winston Cox (October 19, 1875 – September 9, 1939) was an associate justice of the District Court of the United States for the District of Columbia.

Education and career

Born in Bridle Creek, an unincorporated community in Grayson County, Virginia, Cox received a Bachelor of Laws from George Washington University Law School in 1901. He was in private practice in Washington, D.C. from 1901 to 1930, and was also an instructor at Georgetown Law from 1913 to 1915, a special assistant to the United States Attorney General in enforcement of anti-trust laws and matters arising in special war activities of the United States from 1914 to 1919. He also served as a member of the District Selective Service Board from 1917 to 1918, and was a regional counsel to the United States Railroad Administration from 1919 to 1920. He was a professorial lecturer at George Washington University from 1928 to 1930.

Federal judicial service

Cox was nominated by President Herbert Hoover on June 23, 1930, to the Supreme Court of the District of Columbia (District Court of the United States for the District of Columbia from June 25, 1936, now the United States District Court for the District of Columbia), to a new Associate Justice seat authorized by 46 Stat. 785. He was confirmed by the United States Senate on July 1, 1930, and received his commission on July 7, 1930. His service terminated on September 9, 1939, due to his death.

See also
 Brookside Farm, Cox's childhood home

References

Sources
 

1875 births
1939 deaths
Judges of the United States District Court for the District of Columbia
United States district court judges appointed by Herbert Hoover
20th-century American judges
George Washington University Law School alumni